Nepal  wine is produced at the world's highest elevation vineyard (2,750m/9,000ft), although vintners in the Andes near Salta, Argentina claim even higher elevations.
It is located at Jomsom (Nepali: जोमसोम), Anapurna. Initially, 2 hectares were planted in 1992.

About 50 brands of wine are produced in Nepal. Due to stringent alcohol sales in neighboring Bihar, Nepal sales are rising and continuing to remain strong. A majority of Nepal sales are from Bihar as tourists seek of liquor.  

Big Master Wines, is owned by the parent company, Royal Kathmandu Himalaya Beverage Pvt. Ltd. It is Nepal's biggest wine-producing company and offers the widest range of wines in the country. Now the company is gearing up to officially launch, Nepal's first luxury wines 'Syrah and Chenin Blanc' under its flagship brand, 'Big Master'.

References

Alcohol in Nepal
Wine by country